The Midwest Division was a division in the Western Conference of the National Basketball Association (NBA).  The division was created at the start of the 1970–71 season, when the league expanded from 14 to 17 teams with the addition of the Buffalo Braves, the Cleveland Cavaliers and the Portland Trail Blazers. The league realigned itself into two conferences, the Western Conference and the Eastern Conference, with two divisions each in each conference. The Midwest Division began with four inaugural members, the Chicago Bulls, the Detroit Pistons, the Milwaukee Bucks and the Phoenix Suns. The Bulls and the Suns joined from the Western Division, while the Pistons and the Bucks joined from the Eastern Division.

The division was disbanded when the league expanded from 29 to 30 teams with the addition of the Charlotte Bobcats at the start of the 2004–05 season. The league realigned itself into two conferences with three divisions each. The Midwest Division was replaced with two new divisions, the Southwest Division and the Northwest Division. The 2003–04 season, the division's last season, consisted of seven teams, the Dallas Mavericks, the Denver Nuggets, the Houston Rockets, the Memphis Grizzlies, the Minnesota Timberwolves, the San Antonio Spurs and the Utah Jazz. The Mavericks, the Rockets, the Grizzlies and the Spurs joined the Southwest Division, while the Nuggets, the Timberwolves and the Jazz joined the Northwest Division.

The Denver Nuggets played 28 seasons in the Midwest Division, longer than any other team. Three teams, the Heat, the Magic and the Charlotte Hornets, only played one season each in the division. None of the four inaugural members remained when the division was disbanded in 2004.

Despite the name, the division was made up mostly of teams who were located far outside the Midwest from 1980 to 2004.

Results

The San Antonio Spurs won the most Midwest Division titles with eleven. The Milwaukee Bucks and the Utah Jazz won the second most titles with six. However, the Bucks won those six titles in only ten seasons before they left the division. The 34th and last division champion was the Minnesota Timberwolves. Seven division champions had or tied for the best regular season record during the season.

Five NBA champions came from the Midwest Division. The Spurs and the Houston Rockets won two championships each, while the Bucks won one championship. All of them, except the 1994–95 Rockets, were division champions.

The Midwest Division twice had six teams qualified for the playoffs. In the 1985–86 season, all six teams from the division qualified for the playoffs, while in the 2003–04 season, six of seven teams qualified for the playoffs. In the division's first and last season, all teams in the division had winning percentages above 0.500 (50%).

Teams

Notes
 denotes an expansion team.
 denotes a team that merged from the American Basketball Association (ABA).

Team timeline

Division champions

Titles by team

Season results

Rivalries

Houston Rockets vs. San Antonio Spurs

Utah Jazz vs. Houston Rockets

Notes
 Because of a lockout, the season did not start until February 5, 1999, and all 29 teams played a shortened 50-game regular season schedule.

References
General

Specific

External links
NBA.com Team Index

Western Conference (NBA)
National Basketball Association divisions
Sports in the Midwestern United States